Passalus latifrons is a beetle of the Family Passalidae.

Passalidae